The 2016–17 Jacksonville Dolphins men's basketball team represented Jacksonville University during the 2016–17 NCAA Division I men's basketball season. The Dolphins, led by third-year head coach Tony Jasick played their home games at Swisher Gymnasium on the university's Jacksonville, Florida campus as members of the Atlantic Sun Conference.  They finished the  season 17–16, 5–9 in ASUN play to finish in sixth place. They lost in the quarterfinals of the ASUN tournament to North Florida. They were invited to the CollegeInsider.com Tournament where they lost in the first round to Saint Francis (PA).

Previous season
The Dolphins finished the 2015–16 season 16–16, 8–6 in ASUN play to finish in a three way tie for second place. They lost in the quarterfinals of the ASUN tournament to Lipscomb.

Roster

Schedule and results
 
|-
!colspan=9 style=| Non-conference regular season

|-
!colspan=9 style=| Atlantic Sun Conference regular season

|-
!colspan=9 style=| Atlantic Sun tournament

|-
!colspan=9 style=| CIT

References

Jacksonville Dolphins men's basketball seasons
Jacksonville
Jacksonville